Roy Mark Hofheinz Jr. (born 1935) is an American academic, sinologist who was professor of Government at Harvard University. He is best-known for his work on the Chinese Communist Revolution.

Personal life 
Hofheinz was born in Houston, Texas.  He is the son of Texas politician and developer Roy Hofheinz. He earned his Bachelor of Arts degree at Rice University and was a Rhodes Scholar.  He was awarded a Ph.D. at Harvard in 1967.

Academic career 
In 1975–1979, Hofheinz served as director of the Fairbank Center for East Asian Research.

Selected works
In a statistical overview derived from writings by and about Roy Hofheinz Jr, OCLC/WorldCat encompasses roughly 10+ works in 30 publications in 4 languages and 1,000+ library holdings .  

 Rural Administration in Communist China (1962)
 Chinese Communist Politics in Action (1969)
 China County Development: a Preliminary Atlas (1972)
 The Origins of Chinese Communist Concept of Rural Revolution (1974)
 A Catalog of Kuang-tung Land Records in the Taiwan Branch of the National Central Library  (1975)
 The Broken Wave: the Chinese Communist Peasant Movement, 1922-1928 (1977)
 The Eastasia Edge (1982)

Notes

References
 Suleski, Ronald Stanley. (2005). The Fairbank Center for East Asian Research at Harvard University: a Fifty Year History, 1955–2005.'' Cambridge: Harvard University Press. ;  OCLC 64140358

1935 births
American Rhodes Scholars
21st-century American historians
21st-century American male writers
American sinologists
Rice University alumni
Harvard University alumni
Harvard University faculty
Historians of China
Living people
American male non-fiction writers
Academics from Texas